WTCC (90.7 FM) is a radio station licensed to serve Springfield, Massachusetts.  The station is owned by Springfield Technical Community College, with studios and transmitter located in Garvey Hall on the STCC campus. It airs a College radio format.

The station was assigned the WTCC call letters by the Federal Communications Commission.

See also
List of community radio stations in the United States

References

External links

TCC
Community radio stations in the United States
Mass media in Springfield, Massachusetts
Springfield Technical Community College
Radio stations established in 1971